Tao Jiaying (Chinese: 陶嘉莹, born 15 April 1993) is a Chinese female short track speed skater. She won the gold medal for Ladies' 1500 meters and the bronze medal for 1000 meters in 2013 Winter Universiade, Trentino.

References

1993 births
Living people
Chinese female speed skaters
Chinese female short track speed skaters
Universiade medalists in short track speed skating
Universiade gold medalists for China
Universiade bronze medalists for China
Competitors at the 2013 Winter Universiade
20th-century Chinese women
21st-century Chinese women